Koalamagic is a live album released in 2001 by Deerhoof on the Australian label Dual Plover. The album includes five tracks, some of which are several songs put together, recorded over the course of the band's early, noise-oriented years, from 1996 to 2000. The material is culled from Deerhoof's first full length, Holdypaws, Halfbird, and Reveille. The tracks are presented in the reverse-chronological order featuring various lineups, starting with the trio that recorded Reveille. The following tracks include performances by Rob Fisk, a founding member, and other short-lived members like Kelly Goode, Jess Goddard, and Chris Cooper. Ned Raggett of AllMusic described the album as "a sort-of band history as alternate arrangements and lineups came and went".

Track listing
gore in rut / the pickup bear / holy night fever / who nu / queen of the lake / god save the queen bee / queen orca wicca wind (2000) – 19:26
insist (2000) – 2:57
a-town test site (1999) – 1:57
come see the duck (1998) – 1:48
sophie / bendinin / t.c. - tender care / the pickup bear (1996) – 5:58

Personnel

 Chris Cooper – guitar 
 John Dieterich – guitar 
 Rob Fisk – guitar , bass 
 Jess Goddard – keyboard 
 Kelly Goode – keyboard 
 Satomi Matsuzaki – vocals , bass guitar , keyboard , bells 
 Greg Saunier – drums, vocals

References

External links
 Deerhoof Discography
 Last.fm page
 Discogs page

Deerhoof albums
2001 live albums